Chin Woo Athletic Association (also Jing Wu Athletic Association) is an international martial arts organisation founded in Shanghai, China, on July 7, 1910, but some sources cite dates in 1909. Its name is also spelled in many other ways throughout the world - Ching Mo, Chin Woo, Ching Mou, Ching Wu, Jing Mo, Jing Wo, Jing Wu - but all of them are based on the same two Chinese characters - jing wu. It has at least 59 branches based in 22 or more countries worldwide, where it is usually known as an "athletic association" or "federation".

History
Jing Wu was founded as the Jing Wu Athletic Association in Shanghai, China in the early 20th century. Many sources, including the official websites of its branches in various countries, claim that Jing Wu was founded by the martial artist Huo Yuanjia, who died not long after its establishment. Jing Wu was actually founded by a committee of persons, including members of the Tongmenghui, such as Chen Qimei, Nong Zhu, and Chen Tiesheng. Due to Huo's popularity and recent death, the committee had decided that he should be the "face" of Jing Wu, resulting in his strong association with it.

After Jing Wu was founded, a number of prominent martial artists in China at that time were invited to teach there. They include: Chen Zizheng (陳子正), Eagle Claw master; Luo Guangyu (羅光玉), Seven Star Praying Mantis master; Geng Jishan (耿繼善), Xingyi master; Wu Jianquan, founder of Wu-style taijiquan, and Zhao Lianhe (趙連和), a master of the Northern Shaolin, became Chief Instructor after Huo Yuanjia's death.

As one of the first public martial arts institutes in China, Jing Wu was intended to create a structured environment for teaching and learning martial arts as opposed to the secretive training that had been common in the past. The founders of Jing Wu felt that the association would keep alive traditions that secrecy and social change would otherwise doom. The basic curriculum drew from several styles of martial arts, giving practitioners a well-rounded martial background in addition to whatever they wished to specialise in. Jing Wu inspired the ecumenism seen in the Chinese martial arts community during the Republican era, giving rise to such efforts as the National Martial Arts Institutes. Sun Yat-sen, founder of the Republic of China, attended the third annual event held by Jing Wu in 1915, giving a speech of encouragement to the attendees. When Sun Yat-sen attended again at the 10th annual event in 1920, he also wrote for a special Jing Wu newsletter and made a plaque with the engraving "martial spirit".

During the period of the Japanese sphere of influence, the Twenty-One Demands sent to the government of the Republic of China resulted in two treaties with Japan on 25 May 1915. This prevented the ruling class from exercising full control over the commoners. With their new freedom, Huo's students purchased a new building to serve as the organisation's headquarters and named it "Jing Wu Athletic Association". The association accepted new styles of martial arts other than those taught by Huo. In 1918, Jing Wu Athletic Association opened a branch at Nathan Road in Hong Kong.

In July 1919, Jing Wu Athletic Association sent five representatives to Southeast Asia to expand their activities overseas. The five were Chen Gongzhe, Li Huisheng, Luo Xiaoao, Chen Shizhao and Ye Shutian. They made their first stop in Saigon, Vietnam, where they opened the first Chin Woo school outside of China. They opened schools in Malaysia and Singapore later as well. By 1923, these five masters had opened schools all over Southeast Asia and visited nine different countries.

Present
In 1966, Shanghai's Jing Wu school was forced to discontinue its activities during the Cultural Revolution, whose goals were to destroy old ideas, cultures and customs for the purpose of modernizing China. Those restrictions were lifted in 1976, after which Shanghai's Chin Woo school resumed its activities.

Chin Woo is currently one of the largest wushu organisations in the world with branches in various countries, including Japan, Hong Kong, Macau, Vietnam, Malaysia, Singapore, Sri Lanka, Poland, Canada, the United Kingdom, the United States, Australia and Switzerland. The United States headquarters of Chin Woo is located at 899 E. Arapaho Rd., Richardson, TX 75081.

Curriculum
During the early days of Jing Wu in Shanghai, the chief instructor, Zhao Lianhe, developed a curriculum that became the standard Jing Wu sets (Fundamental Routines).
 Shi Er Lu Tan Tui (十二路潭腿; Twelve Roads of Spring Leg)
 Gong Li Quan (功力拳; Power Fist)
 Jie Quan (节拳; Connecting Fist)
 Da Zhan Quan (大战拳; Big Battle Fist)
 Qun Yang Gun (群羊棍; Shepherd Staff)
 Ba Gua Dao (八卦刀; Eight Trigrams Broadsword)
 Wu Hu Qiang (五虎枪; Five Tiger Spear)
 Jie Tan Tui (接潭腿; Tan Tui Sparring)
 Tao Quan (套拳; Set Fist)
 Dan Dao Chuan Qiang (单刀串枪; Broadsword versus Spear)

Other styles were taught to students as well, but they varied from school to school and depended on the background of the master teaching that style. The standard curriculum, however, was taught in all Jing Wu schools.

Jing Wu in popular culture

References

Bibliography
 
 
 Yandle, Robert (2010) 'Jingwu Athletic Association - 100 Years'. Beckett Media. Dallas, Texas

External links

Main branches:
 Shanghai Chin Woo Athletic Federation 
 World Jing Wu Federation
 Malaysia Jing Wu Athletic Association Selangor and Kuala Lumpur
 Western Australia Chin Woo Athletic Association
 Chin Woo Athletic Association of New Zealand
 Chin Woo Italia
 Shanghai Chin Woo Athletic Association  
 German Chin Woo Athletic Federation
 Italian Chin Woo Athletic Association
 Ching Wu Athletic Association (Winnipeg, Canada)
 Chin Woo Portugal Association (Lisbon, Portugal)
 Western Canada Kootenay Chin Woo (Creston, BC, Canada) 
 The Dutch Chin Woo Foundation

Secondary branches:
 Chin Woo Portugal Alges School (Lisbon, Portugal)
 Canadian Chin Woo Athletic Association (Vancouver, BC, Canada)

1910 establishments in China
Sports organizations established in 1910
Sports organizations of China
Wushu organizations
Chinese martial arts